David Allen (born 21 March 1992) is a British professional boxer. He has challenged twice for the Commonwealth heavyweight title in 2017 and 2018. He holds a notable win over former world heavyweight champion Lucas Browne.

Professional career

Allen vs. Cesna 
Allen started his professional career with a six-round points win over Rolandas Cesna in 2012.

Allen vs. Whyte 
After being undefeated in his first ten professional fights, he fought Dillian Whyte in July 2016 at short notice for the vacant WBC International heavyweight title, losing by unanimous points decision over ten rounds.

Allen vs. Ortiz 
In December 2016, he fought undefeated Luis Ortiz (26-0) on the undercard of Anthony Joshua vs. Éric Molina, losing by seventh-round stoppage.

Allen vs. Thomas 
He fought Lenroy Thomas in May 2017 for the vacant Commonwealth heavyweight title, losing a split decision over twelve rounds.

Allen vs. Thomas II 
Their rematch in March 2018 was declared a technical draw after Allen suffered a bad cut over the right eye in the first round.

Allen vs. Yoka 
Two fights later, Allen travelled to Paris to face undefeated Olympic gold medalist Tony Yoka (4-0), but was unsuccessful in a tenth-round technical knockout loss.

Allen vs. Browne 
The biggest win of Allen's career came in a third-round knockout of former WBA (Regular) champion Lucas Browne in April 2019.

Allen vs. Price 
Allen next fought David Price in July 2019, retiring in the tenth-round to suffer his fifth career loss.

Allen vs. Darch 
He rebounded from the loss with a third-round knockout victory over Dorian Darch on 8 February 2020 in Sheffield.

Retirement 
Allen announced his retirement from boxing on 15 November 2020, stating, "The reason for me calling it a day is simple. I don’t want to get punched anymore. Long gone are the days of the kid from Donny who wants to fight. All I want now is a nice quiet life with a wife and some kids. Healthy and happy getting nice and fat." However, in April 2021, he revealed via social media that he plans to return to boxing, saying, ""I had a meeting today and what I wanted was, I wanted to come back and box, but I want to come back at a low level. I want to enjoy my boxing, I want to win titles, whatever titles they may be. I will be boxing again but I won't be coming back and boxing Alen Babic and Fabio Wardley for at least 12 months. I just want to come back and enjoy boxing."

Allen vs. Pesce 
On 27 August, 2021, Allen returned from retirement to fight Andrea Pesce at the Ponds Forge Arena in Yorkshire. Allen comfortably won by technical knockout in the 2nd round.

Professional boxing record

References

External links

1992 births
British male boxers
Living people
Heavyweight boxers
David Allen - Profile, News Archive & Current Rankings at Box.Live